The R245 road is a regional road in Ireland. It is a loop road from the N56 road in County Donegal. Sections of the road form part of the Wild Atlantic Way.

The R245 travels north from the N56 at Letterkenny to Ramelton. From Ramelton the road travels north again to Milford and then along Mulroy Bay before turning west to Carrigart. At Carrigart, the R248 road leads to the Rosguill Peninsula and its Atlantic Drive. From Carrigart the R245 turns southwest crossing the Lackagh River before rejoining the N56.

References

Regional roads in the Republic of Ireland
Roads in County Donegal